The Effects of Hurricane Dennis in Alabama, USA included $127 million (2005 USD) in damage and three injuries. Dennis made landfall on the Florida Panhandle as a Category 3 hurricane on the Saffir-Simpson Hurricane Scale on July 10, 2005, before tracking over Alabama as a minimal hurricane. In preparation for the storm, about 500,000 people were given evacuation orders, and the Red Cross opened 87 shelters. As a result, all southbound lanes of Interstate 65 from Mobile to Montgomery were closed.

Hurricane Dennis caused modest damage in Alabama, mostly related to moderate wind gusts. Several counties within the state reported downed trees and powerlines, leaving a total of 280,000 people without electric power. Downed trees also left numerous county and state roads temporarily impassable. Maximum rainfall peaked at  near Camden and top wind gusts surpassed . Despite the damage, there were no fatalities, although three injuries occurred. Also, an unconfirmed tornado tore the roof off a home, forcing emergency workers to evacuate a man inside.

Storm history and preparations 

On June 29, 2005, a tropical wave emerged off the west coast of Africa. Gradually, the system organized on July 2 and formed a broad low pressure area. The system continued to organize, and became a tropical depression on July 4. Tracking westward, it became a tropical storm on July 5 and a hurricane on July 7. Dennis rapidly intensified to attain Category 4 status on the Saffir-Simpson Hurricane Scale before making landfall on Cuba. The storm weakened to Category 1 status before re-emerging in the Gulf of Mexico and intensifying. Dennis made landfall on the Florida Panhandle on July 10 before tracking over Alabama as a minimal hurricane.

On July 8, a hurricane watch was put into effect for coastal areas between the Pearl River and the Steinhatchee River. Early on July 9, the hurricane watch was upgraded to a hurricane warning in anticipation of the storm. Early on July 10 prior to Dennis' landfall, the warning was discontinued for locations between the Steinhatchee River and the Ochlockonee River, leaving Alabama within the advisory. Just hours after the storm moved ashore, the warning was adjusted to include areas from the Alabama/Mississippi border to Destin, Florida. On July 10, the coastal hurricane warning was downgraded to a tropical storm warning, although inland hurricane warnings remained in place. At 2200 (UTC) on July 10, all tropical cyclone advisories were discontinued as the hurricane progressed inland.

About 500,000 people were given evacuation orders in the state, mostly in coastal areas. Residents in Mobile County, and those south of I-10 in Baldwin County, were ordered to evacuate. Similar orders were issued in Mississippi for parts of Jackson, Hancock, and Harrison counties, and for coastal areas in the Florida Panhandle stretching from Escambia County to Bay County.

At 2300 (UTC) on July 9, 2005, all southbound lanes on Interstate 65 from Mobile to Montgomery were closed. Traffic was redirected, making all four lanes northbound to allow evacuations. Likewise, military installations such as NAS Pensacola, Whiting Field, Eglin AFB, Hurlburt Field and Tyndall AFB were all evacuated days before the storm. Red Cross officials opened 87 shelters across the state which were able to hold about 14,000 evacuees.

Impact 

As Hurricane Dennis moved through the state, sustained winds reached minimal hurricane force in the interior of the state. In total, 280,000 people in Alabama experienced power outages during the storm. No deaths occurred, although Dennis caused three injuries  and total damage amounted to $127 million (2005 USD), mostly due to structural damage. There was also severe damage to cotton crops.

This caused numerous rivers to overflow causing widespread, locally major, flash flooding. Parts of Interstate 20 were overwashed with water, temporarily closing the highway. In Dallas County, a mudslide closed a section of State Highway 5. In Greene County, the minor flooding was reported along the Tombigbee River. Throughout the region, numerous bridges were washed away several homes were flooded, sustaining major damage in some cases.

It is reported that the worst damage occurred in Escambia and Monroe counties. In the Escambia County city of Atmore, 100 percent of the city's residents lost electric power for some a period of time during the hurricane. The strongest winds occurred in Escambia County, where gusts surpassed , leaving numerous structures damaged or destroyed as Dennis tracked through the western half of the county. One man in the county was injured by a fallen tree branch. Also, an unconfirmed tornado tore the roof off a home, forcing emergency workers to evacuate a man inside.
In Coffee County, local officials reported wind gusts had blown a carport into a wall of a house. Marengo County received moderate damage, mostly limited to power outages and minor roof and structural damage caused by fallen trees and powerlines. Many customers were without electric power for at least a day, and numerous county roads were covered with debris. A person was injured in Dallas County when a tree landed on their car. Five homes and one business were damaged due to high winds, and thousands of people county-wide experienced power outages. Greene County reported hundreds of downed trees and powerlines causing County Roads 148 and 20 and State Highways 11, 43 and 14 to be temporarily closed. In Forkland, a mobile home caught fire when a powerline fell on the home. A motorist ran into a fallen tree in Boligee although did not sustain injuries. In Perry County, 2,200 homes were without electric power for several hours, and several vehicles and homes were damaged. A structural fire occurred in Russell County and was believed to be ignited by downed powerlines.

Wind gusts in Autauga County surpassed , causing $180,000 dollars (2005 USD) in damage. The Robinson Springs United Methodist Church had part of its roof torn off in Elmore County, while numerous other homes sustained roof damage.  One person was injured in Montgomery County when a tree fell on their vehicle. Another person was injured in Clay County when he ran his vehicle into a downed tree. A structural fire occurred in Randolph County as a result of fallen powerlines.

Aftermath 

On July 10, just hours after Hurricane Dennis made landfall in the Florida Panhandle, President George W. Bush ordered the federal government to provide necessary disaster resources and assets for the state to aid people who were affected by the storm. Also, 45 counties in the state were eligible for federal funds to pay 75 percent of the approved costs for debris removal and emergency protective services related to the hurricane, including requested emergency work undertaken by the federal government. On July 11, Escambia County joined Baldwin and Mobile counties to be eligible to receive individual assistance funds.

Shortly after, on July 13, two Disaster Recovery Centers opened to provide information to those who have suffered damage. The next day, state and federal community relations teams were deployed into Alabama's disaster-declared counties, to assist residents who suffered from Dennis. The Alabama Emergency Management Agency (AEMA) and the Department of Homeland Security's Federal Emergency Management Agency (FEMA) had 20 federal community relations specialists and their state counterparts working in the disaster areas. Subsequently, three more Disaster Recovery Centers became scheduled to open on July 16.
On July 25, four Disaster Recovery Centers in Alabama were scheduled to close. By August 19, over $4 million (2005 USD) in individual assistance funds were received.

See also 

 Effects of Hurricane Dennis in Mississippi
 Effects of Hurricane Dennis in Georgia
 Effects of Hurricane Dennis in Florida

References

External links 

 Hurricane Dennis aftermath
 Damage photos
 

Dennis (2005)
Alabama
2005 in Alabama
Dennis
Dennis Alabama